Thomas Samuel Moorman Jr. (November 16, 1940 – June 18, 2020) was a United States Air Force officer who served as Vice Chief of Staff of the United States Air Force from July 1994 to August 1997.

Early life 
Moorman was born in Washington, D.C. on November 16, 1940, the son of Thomas S. Moorman. He was commissioned through the Air Force Reserve Officer Training Corps program as a distinguished military graduate in 1962.

Military career
Moorman has served in a variety of intelligence and reconnaissance related positions within the United States and worldwide. While stationed at Peterson Air Force Base, Colorado, in 1982, he became deeply involved in the planning and organizing for the establishment of Air Force Space Command. During his tour at The Pentagon in 1987, he also provided program management direction for development and procurement of Air Force surveillance, communications, navigation and weather satellites, space launch vehicles, anti-satellite weapons and ground-based and airborne strategic radars, communications and command centers. He additionally represented the Air Force in the Strategic Defense Initiative program and was authorized to accept SDI program execution responsibilities on behalf of the Air Force. As commander and vice commander of Air Force Space Command, Moorman was responsible for operating military space systems, ground-based radars and missile warning satellites, the nation's space launch centers at Patrick Air Force Base and Vandenberg Air Force Base, the worldwide network of space surveillance radars, as well as maintaining the intercontinental ballistic missile (ICBM) force.

Since retiring from the United States Air Force, Moorman has been an employee of Booz Allen Hamilton. From 1997 to 2009, he served on the board of directors of the Space Foundation, serving as Chairman of the Board from 2008 to 2009. Moorman died at the National Institutes of Health on June 18, 2020 at the age of 79.

Education
1962 Bachelor's degree in history and political science, Dartmouth College, Hanover, New Hampshire.
1965 Squadron Officer School, Maxwell Air Force Base, Ala.
1972 Master's degree in business administration, Western New England College, Springfield, Massachusetts.
1975 Air Command and Staff College, Maxwell Air Force Base, Ala.
1975 Master's degree in political science, Auburn University, Ala.
1979 Air War College, by seminar
1980 National War College, Fort Lesley J. McNair, Washington, D.C.

Assignments
July 1962 – August 1965, intelligence officer, B-47 bombardment wing, Schilling Air Force Base, Kansas
August 1965 – October 1966, mission planner, 9th Strategic Reconnaissance Wing, Beale Air Force Base, California
October 1966 – November 1967, operations officer, 432nd Reconnaissance Technical Squadron, Udon Royal Thai Air Force Base, Thailand
November 1967 – November 1970, reconnaissance intelligence staff officer, 497th Reconnaissance Technical Group, Wiesbaden-Schierstein, West Germany
November 1970 – August 1975, assistant director of evaluation, later executive officer, Air Force Special Projects Production Facility, Westover Air Force Base, Massachusetts
August 1975 – August 1979, executive, later deputy director of plans and programs, Office of Space Systems, Office of the Secretary of the Air Force, Washington, D.C.
August 1979 – June 1980, National War College, Fort Lesley J. McNair, Washington, D.C.
June 1980 – August 1981, deputy military assistant to the secretary of the Air Force, Washington, D.C.
August 1981 – March 1982, director of space operations, North American Aerospace Defense Command, Cheyenne Mountain Complex, Colorado
March 1982 – August 1982, deputy director, Space Defense, Office of the Deputy Chief of Staff for Plans, Peterson Air Force Base, Colorado
August 1982 – July 1984, first director, commander's group, Air Force Space Command, Peterson Air Force Base, Colorado
July 1984 – March 1985, vice commander, 1st Space Wing, Peterson Air Force Base, Colorado
March 1985 – October 1987, director of space systems, Office of the Secretary of the Air Force, Washington, D.C.
October 1987 – March 1990, director of Space and Strategic Defense Initiative programs, Office of the Assistant Secretary of the Air Force for Acquisitions, the Pentagon, Washington, D.C.
October 1987 – March 1990, special assistant for Strategic Defense Initiative to the vice commander of Air Force Systems Command, Andrews Air Force Base, Maryland
March 1990 – March 1992, commander, Air Force Space Command, Peterson Air Force Base, Colorado
March 1992 – July 1994, vice commander, Air Force Space Command, Peterson Air Force Base, Colorado
July 1994 – 1997, vice chief of staff, Headquarters U.S. Air Force, Washington, D.C.
August 1, 1997 – retired

Major awards and decorations

Command Space and Missile Operations Badge
  Air Force Distinguished Service Medal with oak leaf cluster
  Defense Superior Service Medal
  Legion of Merit with oak leaf cluster
  Meritorious Service Medal with oak leaf cluster
  Air Force Commendation Medal with oak leaf cluster
  National Intelligence Distinguished Service Medal
 Space Foundation General James E. Hill Lifetime Space Achievement Award.

Effective dates of promotion
Second Lieutenant Jul 10, 1962
First Lieutenant Jun 9, 1965
Captain Jan 2, 1967
Major May 1, 1973
Lieutenant Colonel Nov 1, 1978
Colonel Jul 1, 1981
Brigadier General Apr 1, 1985
Major General Feb 1, 1988
Lieutenant General Apr 1, 1990
General Aug 1, 1994

Personal
Moorman was the fourth generation in his family to bear the name Thomas Samuel Moorman. His grandfather Thomas Moorman (February 7, 1875 – June 28, 1936) served in the U.S. Army, retiring as a colonel. His father was known as Thomas Moorman Jr. when he attended the U.S. Military Academy.

Moorman was buried at Arlington National Cemetery on December 1, 2021.

References

Dartmouth College alumni
Western New England University alumni
Auburn University alumni
Air University (United States Air Force) alumni
United States Air Force generals
Recipients of the Air Force Distinguished Service Medal
Recipients of the Legion of Merit
American people of Dutch descent
Booz Allen Hamilton people
1940 births
2020 deaths
Recipients of the Defense Superior Service Medal
Vice Chiefs of Staff of the United States Air Force
Recipients of the National Intelligence Distinguished Service Medal
Recipients of the Meritorious Service Medal (United States)
Burials at Arlington National Cemetery